Agylla nivea is a moth of the family Erebidae. It was described by Francis Walker in 1856. It is found in Mexico, Guatemala, Costa Rica, Panama, Colombia, Brazil (São Paulo, Espritu Santo, Paraña), Ecuador and Bolivia.

References

Moths described in 1856
nivea
Moths of North America
Moths of South America